Jacki Lynn Moss (born October 8, 1952) is an American writer, editor, and journalist. She is best known for her article George Hitchings and Gertrude Elion: Nobel Laureates, penned while she was the Managing Editor of COPE and Coping Magazines, a healthcare publication directed at medical professionals specializing in oncology and a consumer magazine for people living with cancer. In 2016, Moss completed her first novel With A Bullet, published by The Wild Rose Press, Inc. Moss is also known for her 2002 book Nashville: City in Harmony and her 1995 book We Have to Talk: The Guide to Bouncing Back From a Break-up.

Life
Moss was born in Atlanta, Georgia, and grew up in Douglasville, Georgia and Montgomery, Alabama.

In the 1970s, Moss attended the University of Alabama and later moved to Caribou, Maine where she worked as a Staff Writer for the Aroostook Republican and News and the Presque Isle Star Herald.

In the 1980s, Moss returned to the Southeast and Nashville, Tennessee, where she would go on to hold several writing, editing, and public relations positions. Moss served as Director of Public Relations for Hubbard Hospital, Managing Editor of COPE and Coping magazines, and Managing Editor of Corporate Board Member and Bank Director magazines. She continued in these endeavors into the 1990s while continuing in freelance journalism for various publications and newspapers to include: The Tennessean, and Business Nashville. She also worked on several projects for TVA Tennessee Valley Authority, Saint Thomas Hospital, and Journal Communications.

In the 2000s, Moss co-founded The Moss Hill Group, a publishing house and the parent company for the on-line, international reseller Vintage Basement.

Writing career
Fiction

 With A Bullet (2016) 
 High Strung (2017) 

Nonfiction

 We Have to Talk: The Guide To Bouncing Back From a Break-up (1995) 
 Meharry Medical College: 125 Years of Caring (2002) 
 Nashville: City In Harmony (2002) 
 It's A Girl, Finally (2011) ASIN B005BYS1BU

Ghostwriter

 Richland Country Club: A History (1989) LCN 89-062724

External links
 Official Website
 The Wild Rose Press, Inc.
 Vintage Basement

1952 births
American editors
American women journalists
Living people
21st-century American women